Gérard Fernandez (born 6 February 1943) is a French sports shooter. He competed in two events at the 1996 Summer Olympics.

References

1943 births
Living people
French male sport shooters
Olympic shooters of France
Shooters at the 1996 Summer Olympics
Place of birth missing (living people)